The Appellate Jurisdiction Act 1876 (39 & 40 Vict c 59) was an Act of the Parliament of the United Kingdom that altered the judicial functions of the House of Lords by allowing senior judges to sit in the House of Lords as life peers with the rank of baron, known as Lords of Appeal in Ordinary.  The first person to be made a law lord under its terms was Sir Colin Blackburn on 16 October 1876, who became Baron Blackburn.

The Act was repealed by the Constitutional Reform Act 2005, which transferred the judicial functions from the House of Lords to the Supreme Court of the United Kingdom. Following the creation of the Supreme Court of the United Kingdom, the practice of appointing Lords of Appeal in Ordinary was discontinued. The last person to be made a law lord was Sir Brian Kerr on 29 June 2009, who became Baron Kerr of Tonaghmore.

See also
Appellate Jurisdiction Act
Judicature Act
List of Law Life Peerages and List of Lords of Appeal in Ordinary

References
Robert William Andrews and Arbuthnot Butler Stoney. The Supreme Court of Judicature Acts, and the Appellate Jurisdiction Act, 1876. Fourth Edition. Reeves & Turner. Chancery Lane, London. 1885. Second Edition. 1883.
M D Chalmers, assisted by Herbert Lush-Wilson. Wilson's Supreme Court of Judicature Acts, Appellate Jurisdiction Act, 1876, Rules of Court and Forms. Third Edition. Stevens and Sons. Chancery Lane, London. 1882.
William Downes Griffith and Richard Loveland Loveland. The Supreme Court of Judicature Acts, 1873, 1875, & 1877: The Appellate Jurisdiction Act, 1876. Second Edition. Stevens and Haynes. Bell Yard, Temple Bar, London. 1877.
William Thomas Charley. The New System of Practice and Pleading Under the Supreme Court of Judicature Acts, 1873, 1875, 1877, The Appellate Jurisdiction Act, 1876, and the Rules of the Supreme Court. Third Edition. Waterlow and Sons. London. 1877.

External links

United Kingdom Acts of Parliament 1876
Acts of the Parliament of the United Kingdom concerning the House of Lords
1876 in British law